Ficken's Warehouse, is located in Bergen Hill, Jersey City, Hudson County, New Jersey, United States. The building was added to the National Register of Historic Places on June 14, 1984. The building was built in 1910 by John H. Fickens and used as a stable and warehouse. The building was later used as the Bergen Station Post Office for 50 years before being converted to residential use.

See also
National Register of Historic Places listings in Hudson County, New Jersey
Bergen-Lafayette, Jersey City

References

External links
 View of Ficken's Warehouse via Google Street View

Buildings and structures completed in 1910
Buildings and structures in Jersey City, New Jersey
Commercial buildings on the National Register of Historic Places in New Jersey
History of Jersey City, New Jersey
National Register of Historic Places in Hudson County, New Jersey
Apartment buildings in Jersey City, New Jersey
New Jersey Register of Historic Places